Daniel Joseph Lecce is an American government official and retired United States Marine Corps major general who has been the deputy director of the Defense Counterintelligence and Security Agency since January 18, 2022. As a marine, Lecce was last the Staff Judge Advocate to the Commandant of the Marine Corps from July 2018 to August 2021. He was previously assigned as the Assistant Judge Advocate General for Military Justice of the United States Navy, senior legal adviser to U.S. Southern Command and general counsel for II Marine Expeditionary Force. His retirement ceremony was held on September 30, 2021.

Born and raised in Pittsburgh, Lecce graduated from the University of Pittsburgh in 1984. He was commissioned in 1986 and completed his J.D. degree at the University of Pittsburgh School of Law in 1987. He later earned an LL.M. degree in operational and international law from the Judge Advocate General of the U.S. Army School in 1997 and an M.A. degree in international public policy from the Paul H. Nitze School of Advanced International Studies at Johns Hopkins University in 2007.

References

External links

|-

|-

Year of birth missing (living people)
Living people
University of Pittsburgh alumni
University of Pittsburgh School of Law alumni
Lawyers from Pittsburgh
The Judge Advocate General's Legal Center and School alumni
Paul H. Nitze School of Advanced International Studies alumni
Recipients of the Meritorious Service Medal (United States)
Recipients of the Legion of Merit
United States Marine Corps generals
Recipients of the Defense Superior Service Medal
Biden administration personnel